Mark Knowles and Daniel Nestor were the defending champions, but lost in the first round this year.

Michael Kohlmann and Alexander Waske won in the final 5–7, 6–4, [10–5], against Julian Knowle and Jürgen Melzer.

Seeds

Draw

Draw

External links
Draw

Doubles